Kolejarz Stróże is a Polish football club based in Stróże.

Kolejarz's biggest success since their foundation in 1949 was finishing in the fourth place of 2011–12 I Liga, just two years after their first promotion to the second tier. After the 2014 demotion to II Liga the club merged into Limanowa based MKS Limanovia. Kolejarz, reestablished, began competing in the Nowy Sącz Klasa A (7th tier).

Current squad 
As of 25 August 2013.

Out on loan

Achievements 
 The play-offs of Poland II Liga in 2006/2007 season
 Promoted to Polish First League in 2009/2010 season

Notable players 
Had international caps for Poland.
  Piotr Madejski (2010–2011)
  Grzegorz Piechna (2009)
  Grzegorz Tomala (2003–2005)

References

External links 
  
 Kolejarz Stróże at 90minut.pl 

 
Association football clubs established in 1949
1949 establishments in Poland
Railway association football clubs in Poland